Sahalava is a rural municipality in Madagascar. It belongs to the district of Vohipeno, which is a part of the region of Fitovinany. The population of the municipality was 1,414 inhabitants in 2018.

Only primary schooling is available. The majority 99.5% of the population of the commune are farmers.  The most important crops are coffee and rice, while other important agricultural products are beans, lychee and cassava. Services provide employment for 0.5% of the population.

Rivers
It is located on the banks of the river Matitanana.

References 

Populated places in Fitovinany